Grant Boyce (born 30 May 1956) is an Australian field hockey player. He competed at the 1984 Summer Olympics in Los Angeles, where the Australian team placed fourth.

His niece Fiona Boyce is also an international field hockey player.

References

External links

1956 births
Living people
Australian male field hockey players
Olympic field hockey players of Australia
Field hockey players at the 1984 Summer Olympics